is a Japanese footballer currently playing as a midfielder for FC Imabari.

Career statistics

Club
.

Notes

References

External links

1994 births
Living people
Japanese footballers
Association football midfielders
Osaka Sangyo University alumni
Japan Football League players
J3 League players
FC Imabari players